KGE may refer to:

KGE, the IATA code for Kaghau Airport, an airport on Kaghau Island in the Solomon Islands
KGE, the National Rail code for Kingsknowe railway station, Edinburgh, Scotland